A quarterback sneak is a play in gridiron football in which the quarterback, upon taking the center snap, dives ahead while the offensive line surges forward. It is usually only used in very short yardage situations.

The advantages of this play are that there are no further ball exchanges beyond the center snap, and that the quarterback receives the ball almost at the line of scrimmage so that it is unlikely that significant yardage could be lost on the play. It is also very unlikely that the play will gain more than one or two yards, though there are exceptions, such as Greg Landry gaining 76 yards, then an NFL record for longest rush by a quarterback, on a sneak. For this reason, it is almost solely used when the ball is very close to the goal-line or on third or fourth down with a yard or less to go to get a first down. The origins of this play date back to 1912 where standout Yale quarterback Graham Winkelbaum first used it in a game against rival Harvard.

Quarterback sneaks are statistically the most likely plays to convert short yardage situations, though each situation varies. Many football statistics sites advocate for increased usage of the play.

QB sneaks have drawbacks in that they tend to expose the quarterback to hits from opposing defenders. Often quarterbacks do not wish to expose themselves to the increased risk of injury associated with the play. This is especially prevalent with traditional pocket passing quarterbacks as Drew Brees or Tom Brady, though Brady has been one of the most effective at running the play despite his lack of speed for a quarterback.

Perhaps the most famous quarterback sneak in football history was executed by Bart Starr of the Green Bay Packers in the famous "Ice Bowl" National Football League championship game against the Dallas Cowboys on December 31, 1967.

Despite the "sneak" moniker, the play is often expected in situations where a short gain is needed.

See also
Quarterback keeper
Quarterback scramble

References

American football plays